Breznay is a Hungarian language surname, which means "from Breznó". It may refer to:

Gábor Breznay (born 1956), Hungarian painter, who lives in Paris
József Breznay (1916–2012), Hungarian painter

See also
 Brezno, Březno (disambiguation), Brzezno (disambiguation), Brzeżno
 Breznik (disambiguation)
 Breznica (disambiguation), Brezniţa (disambiguation), Březnice (disambiguation), Bereżnica

Hungarian-language surnames